The McDonnell Douglas DC-10 is an American trijet wide-body aircraft manufactured by McDonnell Douglas.

The DC-10 was intended to succeed the DC-8 for long-range flights. It first flew on August 29, 1970; it was introduced on August 5, 1971, by American Airlines.

The trijet has two turbofans on underwing pylons and a third one at the base of the vertical stabilizer.
The twin-aisle layout has a typical seating for 270 in two classes.

The initial DC-10-10 had a  range for transcontinental flights. The DC-10-15 had more powerful engines for hot and high airports. The KC-10 Extender (based on the DC-10-30) is a U.S. Air Force tanker.

A design flaw in the original cargo doors caused a poor safety record in early operations. Following the American Airlines Flight 191 crash (the deadliest aviation accident in US history), the US Federal Aviation Administration (FAA) grounded all U.S. DC-10s in June 1979. In August 1983, McDonnell Douglas announced that production would end due to a lack of orders, as it had a widespread public apprehension after the 1979 crash and a poor fuel economy reputation.
Design flaws were rectified and fleet hours increased, for a safety record later comparable to similar era passenger jets.

Production ended in 1989, with 386 delivered to airlines along with 60 KC-10 tanker aircraft. The DC-10 outsold the similar Lockheed L-1011 TriStar. It was succeeded by the lengthened, heavier McDonnell Douglas MD-11.
After merging with McDonnell Douglas in 1997, Boeing upgraded many in-service DC-10s as the MD-10 with a glass cockpit that eliminated the need for a flight engineer. In February 2014, the DC-10 made its last commercial passenger flight. Cargo airlines continue to operate a small number as freighters. The Orbis Flying Eye Hospital is a DC-10 adapted for eye surgery. A few DC-10s have been converted for aerial firefighting use.  Some DC-10s are on display, while other retired aircraft are in storage.

Development

Following an unsuccessful proposal for the U.S. Air Force's CX-HLS (Heavy Logistics System) in 1965, Douglas Aircraft began design studies based on its CX-HLS design. In 1966, American Airlines offered a specification to manufacturers for a widebody aircraft smaller than the Boeing 747 but capable of flying similar long-range routes from airports with shorter runways. The DC-10 became McDonnell Douglas's first commercial airliner after the merger between McDonnell Aircraft Corporation and Douglas Aircraft Company in 1967. An early DC-10 design proposal was for a four-engine double-deck wide-body jet airliner with a maximum seating capacity of 550 passengers and similar in length to a DC-8. The proposal was shelved in favor of a trijet single-deck wide-body airliner with a maximum seating capacity of 399 passengers, and similar in length to the DC-8 Super 60.

On February 19, 1968, in what was supposed to be a knockout blow to the competing Lockheed L-1011, George A. Spater, President of American Airlines, and James S. McDonnell of McDonnell Douglas announced American Airlines' intention to acquire the DC-10. This was a shock to Lockheed and there was general agreement within the U.S. aviation industry that American Airlines had left its competitors at the starting gate. Together with American Airlines' decision to announce the DC-10 order, it was also reported that American Airlines had declared its intention to have the British Rolls-Royce RB211 turbofan engine on its DC-10 aircraft.

The DC-10 was first ordered by launch customers American Airlines with 25 orders, and United Airlines with 30 orders and 30 options in 1968. The first DC-10, a series 10, made its maiden flight on August 29, 1970. Following a test program with 929 flights covering 1,551 hours, the DC-10 received its type certificate from the FAA on July 29, 1971. It entered commercial service with American Airlines on August 5, 1971, on a round trip flight between Los Angeles and Chicago, with United Airlines beginning DC-10 flights later that month. American's DC-10s had seating for 206 and United's seated 222; both had six-across seating in first-class and eight-across (four pairs) in coach. The DC-10's similarity to the Lockheed L-1011 in design, passenger capacity, and launch date resulted in a sales competition that affected profitability of the aircraft.

The first DC-10 version was the "domestic" series 10 with a range of 3,800 miles (3,300 nmi, 6,110 km) with a typical passenger load and a range of 2,710 miles (2,350 nmi, 4,360 km) with maximum payload. The series 15 had a typical load range of 4,350 miles (3,780 nmi, 7,000 km). The series 20 was powered by Pratt & Whitney JT9D turbofan engines, whereas the series 10 and 30 engines were General Electric CF6. Before delivery of its aircraft, Northwest's president asked that the "series 20" aircraft be redesignated "series 40" because the aircraft was much improved over the original design. The FAA issued the series 40 certificate on October 27, 1972.
In 1972, unit cost was US$20M ($M today).

The series 30 and 40 were the longer-range "international" versions. The main visible difference between the models is that the series 10 has three sets of landing gear (one front and two main) while the series 30 and 40 have an additional centerline main gear. The center main two-wheel landing gear (which extends from the center of the fuselage) was added to distribute the extra weight and for additional braking. The series 30 had a typical load range of 6,220 mi (10,010 km) and a maximum payload range of 4,604 mi (7,410 km). The series 40 had a typical load range of 5,750 miles (9,265 km) and a maximum payload range of 4,030 miles (3,500 nmi, 6,490 km).

The DC-10 had two engine options and introduced longer-range variants a few years after entering service; these allowed it to distinguish itself from its main competitor, the L-1011. The 446th and final DC-10 rolled off the Long Beach, California Products Division production line in December 1988 and was delivered to Nigeria Airways in July 1989.  The production run exceeded the 1971 estimate of 438 deliveries needed to break even on the project. As the final DC-10s were delivered McDonnell Douglas had started production of its successor, the MD-11.

In the late 1980s, as international travel was growing due to lower oil prices and more economic freedom, widebody demand could not be met by the delayed Boeing 747-400, MD-11 and the Airbus A330/A340 while the 747-200/300 and DC-10 production ended, and the used DC-10-30s value nearly doubled from less than $20 million to nearly $40 million.

Design

The DC-10 is a low-wing cantilever monoplane, powered by three turbofan engines. Two engines are mounted on pylons that attach to the bottom of the wings, while the third engine is encased in a protective banjo-shaped structure that is mounted on the top of the rear fuselage. The vertical stabilizer, with its two-segment rudder, is mounted on top of the tail engine banjo. The horizontal stabilizer with its four-segment elevator is attached to the sides of the rear fuselage in the conventional manner. The airliner has a retractable tricycle landing gear. To enable higher gross weights, the later −30 and −40 series have an additional two-wheel main landing gear, which retracts into the center of the fuselage.

It was designed for medium to long-range flights that can accommodate 250 to 380 passengers and is operated by a cockpit flight crew of three. The fuselage has underfloor storage for cargo and baggage.

Variants

Original variants

DC-10-10
The DC-10-10 is the initial passenger version introduced in 1971, produced from 1970 to 1981. The DC-10-10 was equipped with GE CF6-6 engines, which was the first civil engine version from the CF6 family. A total of 122 were built.

DC-10-10CF
The −10CF is a convertible passenger and cargo transport version of the −10. Eight were delivered to Continental Airlines and one to United Airlines.

DC-10-15
The −15 variant was designed for use at hot and high airports. The series 15 is basically a −10 fitted with higher-thrust GE CF6-50C2F (derated DC-10-30 engines) powerplants. The −15 was first ordered in 1979 by Mexicana and Aeroméxico. Seven were completed between 1981 and 1983.

Long-range variants

DC-10-30
A long-range model and the most common model produced. It was built with General Electric CF6-50 turbofan engines, with larger fuel tanks and a larger wingspan to increase range and fuel efficiency, and with a set of rear center landing gear to support the increased weight. It was very popular with European flag carriers. A total of 163 were built from 1972 to 1988 and delivered to 38 different customers. The model was first delivered to KLM and Swissair on November 21, 1972, and first introduced in service on December 15, 1972, by the latter.
DC-10-30CF
The convertible cargo/passenger transport version of the DC-10-30. The first deliveries were to Overseas National Airways (ONA) and Trans International Airlines in 1973. A total of 27 were built.
DC-10-30ER
The extended-range version of the DC-10-30. The −30ER aircraft has a higher maximum takeoff weight of 590,000 lb (267,600 kg); is powered by three GE CF6-50C2B engines each producing  of thrust; and is equipped with an additional fuel tank in the rear cargo hold. It has an additional 700 mi of range to 6,600 mi (5,730 nmi, 10,620 km). The first of this variant was delivered to Finnair in 1981. A total of six were built and five −30s were later converted to −30ERs.
DC-10-30AF
Also known as the DC-10-30F. This was the all freight version of the −30. Production was to start in 1979, but Alitalia did not confirm its order then. Production began in May 1984 after the first aircraft order from FedEx. A total of 10 were built.
DC-10-40
The first long-range version fitted with Pratt & Whitney JT9D engines. Originally designated DC-10-20, this model was renamed DC-10-40 after a special request from Northwest Orient Airlines: the aircraft was much improved compared to its original design, with a higher MTOW (on par with the Series 30) and with more powerful engines, and retains the increased wingspan from the DC-10-30. The airline's president wanted to advertise that he had the latest version. The company also wanted its aircraft to be equipped with the same engines as its Boeing 747s for fleet commonality.
Northwest Orient Airlines and Japan Airlines were the only airlines to order the Series 40, respectively ordering 22 and 20 aircraft. The Northwest DC-10-40s were delivered with improved engines, Pratt & Whitney JT9D-20 engines producing 50,000 lbf (222 kN) of thrust and a MTOW of 555,000 lb (251,815 kg). The DC-10-40s delivered to Japan Airlines were equipped with P&W JT9D-59A engines that produced a thrust of 53,000 lbf (235.8 kN) and a MTOW of 565,000 lb (256,350 kg).
Forty-two DC-10-40s were built from 1973 to 1983. Externally, the DC-10-40 can be distinguished from the DC-10-30 by a slight bulge near the front of the nacelle for the #2 (tail) engine.

Proposed variants

DC-10-20
A proposed version of the DC-10-10 with extra fuel tanks, 3-ft (0.9 m) extensions on each wingtip and a rear center landing gear. It was to use Pratt & Whitney JT9D-15 turbofan engines, each producing 45,500 lbf (203 kN) of thrust, with a maximum takeoff weight of 530,000 lb (240,400 kg). But engine improvements led to increased thrust and increased takeoff weight. Northwest Orient Airlines, one of the launch customers for this longer-range DC-10 requested the name change to DC-10-40.
DC-10-50
A proposed version with Rolls-Royce RB211-524 engines for British Airways. The order never came and the plans for the DC-10-50 were abandoned after British Airways ordered the Lockheed L-1011-500 instead.
DC-10 Twin
 Two-engine designs were studied for the DC-10 before the design settled on the three-engine configuration.  Later a shortened DC-10 version with two engines was proposed against the Airbus A300.

Tanker versions

The KC-10 Extender is a military version of the DC-10-30CF for aerial refueling. The aircraft was ordered by the U.S. Air Force and delivered from 1981 to 1988. A total of 60 were built. These aircraft are powered exclusively by General Electric CF6 turbofan engines.

The KDC-10 was an aerial refueling tanker for the Royal Netherlands Air Force. These were converted from civil airliners (DC-10-30CF) to a similar standard as the KC-10. Also, commercial refueling companies Omega Aerial Refueling Services and Global Airtanker Service operate two KDC-10 tankers for lease. Four have been built.

The DC-10 Air Tanker is a DC-10-based firefighting tanker aircraft, using modified water tanks from Erickson Air-Crane.

MD-10 upgrade

The MD-10 is an upgrade to add a glass cockpit to the DC-10 with the re-designation to MD-10. The upgrade included an Advanced Common Flightdeck used on the MD-11 and was launched in 1996. The new cockpit eliminated the need for the flight engineer position and allowed common type rating with the MD-11. This allows companies such as FedEx Express, which operate both the MD-10 and MD-11, to have a common pilot pool for both aircraft. The MD-10 conversion now falls under the Boeing Converted Freighter program where Boeing's international affiliate companies perform the conversions.

Operators

As of January 2023, one MD-10 is in commercial service with TAB Airlines. 

On January 8, 2007, Northwest Airlines retired its last remaining DC-10 from scheduled passenger service, thus ending the aircraft's operations with major airlines. Regarding the retirement of Northwest's DC-10 fleet, Wade Blaufuss, spokesman for the Northwest chapter of the Air Line Pilots Association said, "The DC-10 is a reliable airplane, fun to fly, roomy and quiet, kind of like flying an old Cadillac Fleetwood. We're sad to see an old friend go." Biman Bangladesh Airlines was the last commercial carrier to operate the DC-10 in passenger service.  The airline flew the DC-10 on a regular passenger flight for the last time on February 20, 2014, from Dhaka, Bangladesh to Birmingham, UK.  Local charter flights were flown in the UK until February 24, 2014.

Non-airline operators included the Royal Netherlands Air Force with two DC-10-30CF-based KDC-10 tanker aircraft until their retirement in 2019 and 2021 respectively, the USAF with its 59 KC-10s, and the 10 Tanker Air Carrier with its modified DC-10-10 used for fighting wildfires. Orbis International has used a DC-10 as a flying eye hospital. Surgery is performed on the ground and the operating room is located between the wings for maximum stability.  In 2008, Orbis chose to replace its aging DC-10-10 with a DC-10-30 jointly donated by FedEx and United Airlines. The newer DC-10 was converted into MD-10 configuration, and began flying as an eye hospital in 2010. One former American Airlines DC-10-10 is operated by the Missile Defense Agency as the Widebody Airborne Sensor Platform (WASP).  Tanker 10 Air Carrier, an aerial firefighting company, currently operates four DC-10-30 aircraft converted for aerial fire suppression retardant drops.

Accidents and incidents
As of September 2015, the DC-10 had been involved in 55 accidents and incidents, including 32 hull-loss accidents, with 1,261 occupant fatalities. Of these accidents and incidents, it has been involved in nine hijackings resulting in one death and a bombing resulting in 170 occupant fatalities. Despite its poor safety record in the 1970s, which gave it an unfavorable reputation, the DC-10 has proved to be a reliable aircraft with a low overall accident rate as of 1998.  The DC-10's initially poor safety record has continuously improved as design flaws were rectified and fleet hours increased. The DC-10's lifetime safety record is comparable to similar second-generation passenger jets as of 2008.

Cargo door problem and other major accidents

Instead of conventional inward-opening plug doors, the DC-10 has cargo doors that open outward; this allows the cargo area to be completely filled, as the doors do not occupy otherwise usable interior space when open. To overcome the outward force from pressurization of the fuselage at high altitudes, outward-opening doors must use heavy locking mechanisms. In the event of a door lock malfunction, there is greater potential for explosive decompression.

On June 12, 1972, American Airlines Flight 96 lost its aft cargo door above Windsor, Ontario. Before takeoff, the door appeared secure, but the internal locking mechanism was not fully engaged. Many control cables to the empennage were cut, leaving the pilots with very limited control of the aircraft. Despite this, the crew performed a safe emergency landing. U.S. National Transportation Safety Board (NTSB) investigators found the cargo door design to be dangerously flawed, as the door could be closed without the locking mechanism fully engaged, and this condition was not apparent from visual inspection of the door nor from the cargo-door indicator in the cockpit. The NTSB recommended modifications to make it readily apparent to baggage handlers when the door was not secured, and also recommended adding vents to the cabin floor, so that the pressure difference between the cabin and cargo bay during decompression could quickly equalize without causing further damage. Although many carriers voluntarily modified the cargo doors, no airworthiness directive was issued, due to a gentlemen's agreement between the head of the FAA, John H. Shaffer, and the head of McDonnell Douglas's aircraft division, Jackson McGowen. McDonnell Douglas made some modifications to the cargo door, but the basic design remained unchanged, and problems persisted.

On March 3, 1974, in an accident circumstantially similar to American Airlines Flight 96, a cargo-door blowout caused Turkish Airlines Flight 981 to crash near Ermenonville, France, in the deadliest air crash in history at the time — 346 passengers and crew died. The cargo door of Flight 981 had not been fully locked, though it appeared so to both cockpit crew and ground personnel. The Turkish aircraft had a seating configuration that exacerbated the effects of decompression, and as the cabin floor collapsed into the cargo bay, control cables were severed and the aircraft became uncontrollable. Investigators found that the DC-10's relief vents were not large enough to equalize the pressure between the passenger and cargo compartments during explosive decompression. Following this crash, a special subcommittee of the United States House of Representatives investigated the cargo-door issue and the certification by the Federal Aviation Administration (FAA) of the original design. An airworthiness directive was issued, and all DC-10s underwent mandatory door modifications. The DC-10 experienced no more major incidents related to its cargo door after FAA-approved changes were made.

On May 25, 1979, American Airlines Flight 191 crashed immediately after takeoff from Chicago O'Hare Airport. Its left engine and pylon assembly swung upward over the top of the wing, severing the leading edge slat actuator hydraulic lines. The slats retracted under the aerodynamic forces, causing the left wing to stall. This, combined with asymmetric thrust due to the missing engine, caused the aircraft to rapidly roll to the left, descend, and crash, killing all 271 people on board and two on the ground. Following the crash, the FAA withdrew the DC-10's type certificate on June 6, 1979, grounding all U.S.-registered DC-10s and those from nations with agreements with the United States, and banning all DC-10s from U.S. airspace. These measures were rescinded five weeks later on July 13, 1979, after the slat actuation and position systems were modified, along with stall warning and power supply changes. In November 1979, the FAA fined American Airlines for removing the engine and its pylon as a single unit in its maintenance procedure, thus damaging the structure and causing the engine separation, rather than removing the engine from the pylon before removing the pylon from the wing as advised by McDonnell Douglas.

On July 19, 1989, United Airlines Flight 232 crashed at Sioux City, Iowa after an uncontained engine failure of the tail engine earlier in the flight disabled all hydraulic systems and rendered most flight controls inoperable. The flight crew, assisted by a deadheading DC-10 flight instructor, performed a partially controlled emergency landing by constantly adjusting the thrust of the remaining two engines; 185 people on board survived, but 111 others died, and the aircraft was destroyed. The DC-10 was designed without backup flight controls because it was considered extremely improbable that all hydraulic systems would fail. However, due to their close proximity under the tail engine, the engine failure ruptured all three, resulting in total loss of control to the elevators, ailerons, spoilers, horizontal stabilizer, rudder, flaps and slats. Following the accident, hydraulic fuses were installed in the #3 hydraulic system below the tail engine on all DC-10 aircraft to ensure that sufficient control remains if all three hydraulic systems are damaged in this area.

Other accidents with fatalities
One cabin window separated from the fuselage after it was struck by debris flung from the exploding engine. The passenger sitting next to that window was killed and ejected from the aircraft. The crew initiated an emergency descent and landed the aircraft safely.
 March 1, 1978: Continental Airlines Flight 603, a DC-10-10, commenced a takeoff from Los Angeles International Airport when the recapped tread of a tire on the left main landing gear separated, causing the blowout of two adjacent tires, which ruptured a fuel tank. This, combined with excessive heat from the rejected takeoff, resulted in a massive fire. Two passengers were killed in the ensuing evacuation and two died later from injuries sustained in the accident.
 October 31, 1979: Western Airlines Flight 2605, a DC-10-10, collided with construction equipment after landing on a closed runway at Mexico City International Airport, killing 72 of the 88 people on board and one person on the ground. The crash was caused by failure to follow proper landing guidelines in consideration of the fog on the runway.
 November 28, 1979: Air New Zealand Flight 901, DC-10-30 ZK-NZP, crashed into Mount Erebus on Ross Island, Antarctica during a sightseeing flight over the continent, killing all 257 on board. The accident was caused by the flight coordinates being altered without the flight crew's knowledge, combined with unique Antarctic weather conditions.
 January 23, 1982: World Airways Flight 30, DC-10-30CF registration N113WA, overran the runway at Boston Logan International Airport. All 12 crew survived, but two of the 200 passengers were never found.
 September 13, 1982: Spantax Flight 995, DC-10-30CF EC-DEG, was destroyed by fire after an aborted take-off at Málaga, Spain. A total of 50 passengers were killed and 110 injured due to the flames.
 July 27, 1989: Korean Air Flight 803, DC-10-30 HL7328, crashed short of the runway in bad weather while trying to land at Tripoli, Libya. Seventy-five of the 199 on board plus another four people on the ground were killed in the accident.
 September 19, 1989: UTA Flight 772, DC-10-30 N54629, crashed in the Ténéré Desert in Niger following an in-flight bomb explosion, claiming the lives of all 170 on board.
 December 21, 1992: Martinair Flight 495, DC-10-30CF PH-MBN, crashed while landing in bad weather at Faro, Portugal, killing 54 passengers and crew.
 June 13, 1996: Garuda Indonesia Flight 865, DC-10-30 PK-GIE, had just taken off from Fukuoka Airport, Japan, when a high-pressure blade from the right engine separated. The aircraft was just a few feet above the runway, and the pilot decided to abort the takeoff. Consequently, the DC-10 skidded off the runway and came to a halt  past it, losing one of its engines and its landing gear. Three passengers perished in the accident.
December 21, 1999: Cubana de Aviación Flight 1216, DC-10-30 F-GTDI, overran the runway at La Aurora International Airport, Guatemala City. Eight passengers and eight crew members on board were killed, as were two people on the ground.

Other hull losses
 December 17, 1973: Iberia Airlines Flight 933 crashed and struck the ALS system at Boston Logan International Airport which collapsed the front landing gear. All 168 passengers and crew survived. This is the first hull loss of a DC-10 aircraft.
 November 12, 1975: Overseas National Airways (ONA) Flight 032, DC-10-30CF N1032F, accelerated through a flock of seagulls during its takeoff roll from John F. Kennedy International Airport on a ferry flight. The captain initiated a rejected takeoff, but the right-hand engine exploded, causing a partial braking failure. The pilots steered off the runway to avoid plowing into a blast fence, causing the landing gear to collapse and rupturing a fuel tank; the ensuing fire destroyed the aircraft. All 139 on board—all ONA employees—survived with 32 suffering injuries.
 January 2, 1976: Saudi Arabian Airlines Flight 5130, DC-10-30CF N1031F leased from ONA, landed short of the runway at Istanbul-Yesilköy Airport, tearing off the left-hand engine and the left and center main landing gear. All 362 passengers evacuated safely while one of thirteen crew members was injured. The accident was attributed to an excessively low approach, possibly caused by the first officer using the radar altimeter for altitude reference over irregular terrain.
 December 3, 1983: Korean Air Lines Flight 084, DC-10-30 freighter HL7339, collided head-on during the takeoff roll with SouthCentral Air Flight 59, Piper PA-31 N35206, which was taking off from Anchorage International Airport. The Piper struck the DC-10's left and center main landing gear and three passengers sustained minor injuries; the DC-10 overran the runway and the three crew suffered serious injuries. Investigators determined that the Korean Air Lines pilot became disoriented taxiing in fog, failed to follow correct procedures and confirm his position, and accidentally initiated takeoff from the wrong runway.
 May 21, 1988: American Airlines Flight 70, DC-10-30 N136AA, overran Runway 35L at Dallas/Fort Worth International Airport (DFW) after the flight crew attempted a rejected takeoff. Two crew were seriously injured and the remaining 12 crew and 240 passengers escaped safely. The accident was attributed to a shortcoming in the original design standards; no requirement had existed to test whether partially worn brake pads could stop the aircraft during a rejected takeoff, and 8 of the 10 worn pad sets had failed.
 April 14, 1993: American Airlines Flight 102, DC-10-30 N139AA, skidded off the runway on landing at DFW in a rainstorm, collapsing the nose and left main landing gear and badly damaging the left-hand engine and wing. Two passengers suffered serious injuries during the emergency evacuation, while the remaining 187 passengers and 13 crew escaped safely. The NTSB attributed the crash to poor directional control technique by the captain.
 December 18, 2003: FedEx Express Flight 647, MD-10-10F N364FE, was destroyed by fire after the right main landing gear collapsed due to a hard landing at Memphis International Airport. One of the two pilots and one of the five passengers—all deadheading FedEx employees—suffered minor injuries in the emergency evacuation.
 July 28, 2006: FedEx Express Flight 630, MD-10-10F N391FE, departed runway 18R and burned out at Memphis International Airport following the collapse of the left main landing gear. The two pilots and single passenger suffered minor injuries during the emergency evacuation. The accident was attributed to improper landing gear maintenance.
 October 28, 2016: FedEx Express Flight 910, MD-10-10F N370FE, partially exited the runway at Ft. Lauderdale-Hollywood International Airport following the collapse of the left main landing gear. The accident was attributed to improper landing gear maintenance.

Other notable incidents
 April 7, 1994: The flight crew of Federal Express Flight 705, DC-10-30 N306FE, was attacked by a deadheading FedEx employee in an attempted murder-suicide intended to cause the aircraft to crash. The seriously injured crew returned to Memphis International Airport after subduing the hijacker, using aerobatic maneuvers and damaging the aircraft in the process. The aircraft was repaired and placed back in service.
 July 25, 2000: The right-hand thrust reverser cowl door of Continental Airlines Flight 55, DC-10-30 N13067, shed a strip of metal which landed on the runway at Charles de Gaulle Airport upon takeoff. Minutes later, Air France Flight 4590, operated by a Concorde, ran over the metal strip at high speed, bursting a tire and causing a fuel tank to rupture and burst into flames. The Concorde's pilots attempted to keep control of the aircraft, but it stalled and crashed. The strip of metal was traced to third-party replacement parts not approved by the Federal Aviation Administration.
 January 31, 2001: Japan Airlines Flight 958, DC-10-40 JA8546, was involved in a midair near collision with a Japan Airlines Boeing 747-400 near Yaizu. Both flight crews performed evasive maneuvers; all 677 aboard both aircraft survived, but nine aboard the 747-400 were seriously injured.

Aircraft on display
 The preserved forward fuselage segment of Monarch Airlines' DC-10-30, G-DMCA, is on display at Manchester Airport Aviation Viewing Park, where it is used for teaching and school visits.
 DC-10-30 9G-ANB, which previously belonged to Ghana Airways, is on display and in use as the La Tante DC10 Restaurant in Accra, Ghana.
 DC-10-10 N220AU "Flying Eye Hospital" previously owned by Orbis International was retired in 2016 and is on display at the Pima Air & Space Museum in Tucson, Arizona.
 DC-10-30 Z-AVT "Victor Trimble" previously owned by British Caledonian Airways is preserved as a night club in Bali. The tail end of the aircraft featuring the third engine is mounted on a rooftop in Bali.

Specifications

Deliveries

See also

References

Citations

Bibliography

 Endres, Günter. McDonnell Douglas DC-10. St. Paul, Minnesota: MBI Publishing Company, 1998. .
 Fielder, J.H. and D. Birsch. The DC-10 Case: A Study in Applied Ethics, Technology, and Society. Albany, New York: SUNY Press, 1992. .
 Kocivar, Ben. "Giant Tri-Jets Are Coming". Popular Science, December 1970, pp. 50–52, 116. ISSN 0161-7370.
 Porter, Andrew. "Transatlantic Betrayal " The RB211 and the Demise of Rolls-Royce LTD. Stroud. UK. Amberley, 2013. 
 Steffen, Arthur, A. C. McDonnell Douglas DC-10 and KC-10 Extender. Hinckley, Leicester, UK: Aerofax, 1998. .
 Waddington, Terry. McDonnell Douglas DC-10. Miami, Florida: World Transport Press, 2000. .
 "World Airliner Census". Flight International, Volume 184, Number 5403, August 13–19, 2013, pp. 40–58.

External links

 DC-10/KC-10 history on Boeing.com
 
 

 
1970s United States airliners
Aircraft first flown in 1970
Low-wing aircraft
DC-10
Trijets